The 2016 European Darts Open was the sixth of ten European Tour events on the 2016 PDC Pro Tour. The tournament took place at Maritim Hotel in Düsseldorf, Germany, between 29–31 July 2016. It featured a field of 48 players and £115,000 in prize money, with £25,000 going to the winner.

Robert Thornton was the defending champion, but he lost in the second round to Wes Newton.

Michael van Gerwen won his second European Darts Open title after defeating Peter Wright 6–5 in the final.

Prize money
The prize money of the European Tour events stays the same as last year.

Qualification and format
The top 16 players from the PDC ProTour Order of Merit on 13 May automatically qualified for the event and were seeded in the second round. The remaining 32 places went to players from three qualifying events - 20 from the UK Qualifier (held in Coventry on 20 May), eight from the European Qualifier on 1 June and four from the Host Nation Qualifier on 28 July.

On 27 July 2016, Phil Taylor withdrew from the tournament, moving seeds 14-16 up a place, and promoting Alan Norris to 16 seed, which also meant a 5th Host Nation Qualifier would also qualify for the tournament.

The following players will take part in the tournament:

Top 16
  Michael van Gerwen (winner)
  Peter Wright (runner-up)
  Michael Smith (third round)
  Dave Chisnall (second round)
  Kim Huybrechts (semi-finals)
  Ian White (third round)
  Benito van de Pas (second round)
  Jelle Klaasen (quarter-finals)
  James Wade (third round)
  Mensur Suljović (quarter-finals)
  Terry Jenkins (quarter-finals)
  Robert Thornton (second round)
  Gary Anderson (quarter-finals)
  Stephen Bunting (semi-finals)
  Simon Whitlock (second round)
  Alan Norris (second round)

UK Qualifier
  Gerwyn Price (third round)
  Daryl Gurney (third round)
  Shaun Griffiths (first round)
  James Richardson (second round)
  Andy Jenkins (first round)
  Mark Frost (first round)
  Harry Ward (first round)
  Jonny Clayton (second round)
  Ritchie Edhouse (second round)
  Tony Newell (first round)
  Steve West (second round)
  Kyle Anderson (third round)
  Jamie Caven (second round)
  Robbie Green (first round)
  Andy Boulton (second round)
  John Henderson (first round)
  Wes Newton (third round)
  Andy Hamilton (first round)
  Devon Petersen (second round)

European Qualifier
  John Michael (second round)
  Cristo Reyes (first round)
  Christian Kist (first round)
  Jeffrey de Graaf (first round)
  Kim Viljanen (second round)
  Jan Dekker (third round)
  Daniele Petri (first round)
  Dimitri Van den Bergh (second round)

Host Nation Qualifier
  Martin Schindler (first round)
  Stefan Stoyke (second round)
  Holger Rettig (first round)
  Fabian Herz (first round)
  Max Hopp (first round)

Draw

References

2016 PDC European Tour
2016 in German sport